Syed Yawar Abbas Bukhari is a Pakistani politician who had been a member of the Provincial Assembly of the Punjab from August 2018 till January 2023 and Provincial Minister for Baitul maal and social welfare from December 2020 till April 2022. He has been an active member of PTI. He comes from a well known Syed Family of District Attock. He is an educated and learned person well known for his social services. Currently, he is the Chairman of the Public Accounts Committee of Punjab apart from a few other important committees.

Political career

He was elected to the Provincial Assembly of the Punjab as a candidate of Pakistan Tehreek-e-Insaf (PTI) from PP-1 Attock-I in the 2018 Punjab provincial election. He defeated Hameed Akbar, an independent candidate by receiving 39567 votes.

In December 2020, he was inducted into provincial cabinet of Punjab and appointed Provincial Minister of Punjab for Bait-ul-Maal and Social Welfare.

References

Living people
Punjab MPAs 2018–2023
Pakistan Tehreek-e-Insaf MPAs (Punjab)
Year of birth missing (living people)